Amazing Race : la plus grande course autour du monde ! is a French adventure reality game show based on the international Amazing Race franchise. Following the premise of other versions of the format, the show follows nine teams of two as they race around the world. The show was split into legs, with teams tasked to deduce clues, navigate themselves in foreign areas, interact with locals, perform physical and mental challenges, and travel by air, boat, car, taxi, and other modes of transport. Teams are progressively eliminated at the end of most legs for being the last to arrive at designated Pit Stops. The first team to arrive at the Finish Line wins a grand prize of €50,000.

The show was hosted by Alexandre Delpérier, produced by Shine France for CBS Studios International and in association with ABC Studios (a division of The Walt Disney Company), distributed by The Walt Disney Company France and broadcast on D8.

D8 began airing the season on Monday 22 October 2012, and D17 on Tuesday 23 October 2012, both at 8:50 p.m. CEST (UST+2)

The finale aired on 24 December 2012 with cyber-friends Anthony Martinage and Sonja Sacha as the winners.

Production

Development and filming

On 23 March 2012, it was announced that Canal+ had acquired the format for a French version of the show. Filming started on 30 June 2012 in Paris. Teams travelled to seven countries for 24 days, spanning over in five continents, finishing on 23 July at the Stade de France. This season visited the United Arab Emirates, Thailand, Japan, the United States (making it the first foreign version of the show to visit this country), Brazil and South Africa. Among the highlights are a leg in the streets of Bangkok, an African safari, an excursion to Iguazu Falls and the beaches of Rio de Janeiro. Teams also visited Tokyo, Dubai, Los Angeles, Hawaii and Cape Town.

Unlike its American counterpart, the show is more narrative and informative in content as the show stopped several times throughout each episode to provide viewers with information about the culture and life in the places they visit. Also differing from the American version is that teams are presented their first clue for the next leg at the Pit Stop of the previous leg. The teams are also often told of their next destination at the Pit Stop before they even open these clues. Teams normally don't begin the next leg at the Pit Stop, rather, they are released separately from airports or begin the next leg at hotels they stayed in during the Pit Stop.

Casting
Applications for the show started 16 April 2012 and ended on 29 May 2012. On 27 September 2012, the teams were announced on Télé-Loisirs.fr.

Broadcasting
Amazing Race premiered on D8 22 October 2012 and aired each Mondays at 8:30 p.m., with three rebroadcasts on weekends: two on Saturdays at 1:45 p.m. and 10:45 p.m., and one on Sundays at 5:35 p.m. These rebroadcasts were later cancelled due to declining ratings. D17 also offered a rebroadcast of the show on Tuesdays starting 23 October 2012 at 8:50 p.m.

On Friday before the premiere date, D8 posted the first hour of the premiere episode via Dailymotion.

Cast

Results
The following teams participated in this season, with their relationships at the time of filming. Note that this table is not necessarily reflective of all content broadcast on television due to inclusion or exclusion of some data. Placements are listed in finishing order:

Key
A  team placement means the team was eliminated.
An underlined leg number indicates that there was no mandatory rest period at the Pit Stop and all teams were ordered to continue racing. An underlined team placement indicates that the team came in last and was ordered to continue racing.
An  team placement indicates that the team came in last on a non-elimination leg.
A  means the team chose to use a U-Turn;  indicates the team who received it.

Notes

 Oucéni & Lassana lost their key for the Pont des Arts task. They were able to continue racing, receiving a new key, but incurred a 20-minute penalty once they landed in Dubai.
^ Anthony & Sonja and Heïdi & Michel initially arrived 5th and 6th, respectively, but were issued a 5-minute penalty for taking a taxi to Wat Arun instead of the ferry. This did not affect their placement.

Race summary

Leg 1 (France → United Arab Emirates)

Airdate: 22 October 2012
Paris, Île-de-France, France (Parc de Saint-Cloud – Rond-point de la Balustrade) (Starting Line)
Paris (Pont des Arts)
Paris (Travel Agency – 1, Rue des Mauvais-Garçons )
 Paris (Charles de Gaulle Airport) to Dubai, United Arab Emirates (Dubai International Airport)
Emirate of Dubai (Rub' al Khali Desert) 
 Margham (Skydive Dubai)
Dubai (Burj Khalifa – Observation Deck)
Dubai (Mall of the Emirates – Ski Dubai)
Dubai (Atlantis The Palm, Dubai) 

This series' first Detour was a choice between Perles (Pearls) or Chameaux (Camels). In Perles, teams had to find and count, with the help of a sieve, the exact number of pearls in an earthenware jar filled with sand. Once the exact number of pearls was given to the pearler, accompanied by all the pearls contained in the jar, teams could receive their next clue. In Chameaux, teams, with the help of a camel, had to retrieve two bags of hay and deliver them to the cameleer. While one team member rode the camel, their partner had to guide the animal along the path. Both team members must hang the bags of hay on the camel by the themselves. Once the hay had been brought back, teams would receive their next clue from the cameleer.

In this series' first Roadblock, teams had to travel to a nearby aerodrome to sign up for one of three flights. The chosen team member then had to board an aeroplane and perform a  tandem skydive. If they jumped within a 10-minute time limit, they received their next clue from an instructor once on the ground. Otherwise, they had to wait out a four-hour penalty.

Additional tasks
At Pont des Arts, teams had to use the key in their first clue to find the one Amazing Race colored love lock out of one hundred placed on the bridge it unlocked and give it to the couple of young lovers in exchange for their next clue.
They then had to build a  snowman before the snow melted to receive their next clue.

Additional notes
Teams had to travel to a travel agency located at 1, Rue des Mauvais-Garçons to book one of two flights to Dubai.
Once in Dubai, teams had to find an assigned taxi driver with their picture in one of the airport's car parks, who would drive them to the desert.
The last three teams were not told their placings after arriving at the Pit Stop and were told together of their positions after all the teams arrived after dark.

Leg 2 (United Arab Emirates → Thailand)

Airdate: 29 October 2012
Dubai (Gloria Hotel) (Pit Start)
 Dubai (Dubai International Airport) to Bangkok, Thailand (Suvarnabhumi Airport)
Bangkok (Khlong Toei Market) 
Bangkok (Davis Bangkok Hotel) (Overnight Rest)
Bangkok (Wat Pho – Phra Chedi Moo Ha)
 Bangkok (Wat Arun) 
Ayutthaya (Elephant Stay Reserve)
Ayutthaya (Ayutthaya Historical Park – Wat Phra Mahathat) 

This leg's Detour was a choice between Degustation (Taste) or Provisions (Supplies). In Degustation, teams had to share and eat two bowls of traditional Thai dishes; the first one containing two scorpions, and the second one, three cockroaches. Once they've eaten all of the insects contained in their plates, teams could receive their next clue from the chef. In Provisions, teams were given a shopping list completely written in Thai and had to buy, with their own money, all of the ten ingredients on the list. Once they brought back all the food to an old lady, they could exchange them for their next clue.

In this leg's Roadblock, one team member had to climb the stairs of Wat Arun to the top section and count the statues. Once they gave the correct number (100) to a Thai dancer on the ground, they would receive their next clue. But if they gave a wrong number, they would have to climb again and re-count all the statues before they could give a new answer to the dancer.

Additional tasks
At Davis Bangkok Hotel, teams had to sign up for one of two departure times for the next morning, 7:30 a.m. and 8:00 a.m.
At Wat Pho, teams had to find a young student near the Phra Chedi Moo Ha. They were left to figure out that there were four Chedi, and the student was located beside one of them.
At the Elephant Stay Reserve, teams had to ride an elephant into the river, where they would have to wash off the traditional markings painted on it to receive their next clue.

Leg 3 (Thailand → Japan)

Airdate: 5 November 2012
 Bangkok (Suvarnabhumi Airport) to Tokyo, Japan (Narita International Airport)
Tokyo (Shibuya – Shibuya Scramble Crossing)
Tokyo (Shibuya – Hachikō Statue)
Tokyo (Shibuya – Capsule Land Hotel) (Overnight Rest)
Tokyo (Taitō – Kaminarimon)
Tokyo (Taitō – Raichukaikan Temple) 
Tokyo (Shibuya – Jingu Bashi Bridge)
Tokyo (Shibuya – Hikawa Jinja-Shibuya Temple)  
Tokyo (Minato – Odaiba Park) 

In this leg's Roadblock, one team member had to grab their next clue from a young sumotori while wrestling against him. If the team member stepped outside the red circle or fell on the ground before grabbing their clue, they would have to wait five minutes, or more if there's others teams, to restart the combat.

This leg's Detour was a choice between Nouilles (Noodles) or Poissons (Fishes). In Nouilles, teams had to deliver six bowls of noodles to a group of customers 150 meters away from a restaurant, while wearing a kimono and a pair of geta and without spilling soup below a bowl's red pattern, to receive their next clue. In Poissons, teams had to play a game called goldfish scooping and catch 15 goldfish with rice paper scoopers to receive their next clue.

Additional tasks
At the Shibuya Scramble Crossing, teams had to spot the Amazing Race logo on one of the giant screens, that would after show them a keyword written in Japanese, appearing for ten seconds every two minutes. Teams were left to figure out that this word meant Hachikō and that they were directed to go to the Hachikō statue. A young Tokyoite located beside the statue would then exchange the word Hachikō for their next clue.
At the Capsule Land Hotel, teams had to sign up for seven different departure times for the next morning, where they would receive their next clue, the first one at 8:00 a.m. and the last at 9:00 a.m., each one separated by ten minutes. 
At the Jingu Bashi Bridge, teams had to find, with the help of a drawing of the character given them in the clue envelope, a person dressed as Son Goku, the main protagonist of Dragon Ball, and give him a pink coloured gift to receive their next clue.

Leg 4 (Japan → United States)

Airdate: 12 November 2012
 Tokyo (Narita International Airport) to Honolulu, Oahu, Hawaii, United States (Honolulu International Airport)
Pearl Harbor (USS Missouri ) 
North Shore (Kawela Bay) (Overnight Rest)
Honolulu (Magic Island) 
Kualoa Valley (Secret Island) 

In this leg's Roadblock, one team member had to decipher their next destination (Kawela Bay), which would be presented to them through the use of flag semaphore, to receive their next clue. Racers were given a list of flag positions representing each letter, but they would have to memorize it before a naval officer would present them with their destination.

This leg's Detour was a choice between Glace Pilée (Crushed Ice) or Pierre Cassée (Broken Stone). In Glace Pilée, teams had to fill a bucket with shave ice using a traditional saw to shave a block of ice to receive their next clue. In Pierre Cassée, teams had to take a surfboard out to a buoy in the water using the traditional Hawaiian standard of standing upright on top of it, retrieve a  stone from beneath the buoy, and return it to shore. They would then have to use a chisel to break the stone and retrieve their clue from inside.

Additional task
At Kawela Bay, teams signed up for departure times the following morning. The first four teams would depart at 8:45 a.m., and the last three would depart at 9:00 a.m. During the rest, teams got to enjoy a private beach and a lūʻau.

Leg 5 (United States)

Airdate: 19 November 2012
 Honolulu (Honolulu International Airport) to Los Angeles, California (Los Angeles International Airport)
Los Angeles (Venice Beach) 
Los Angeles (Omni Los Angeles Hotel at California Plaza) (Overnight Rest)
Los Angeles (Walt Disney Concert Hall) 
Los Angeles (Hollywood Boulevard – Hollywood Walk of Fame)
 Santa Clarita (Golden Oak Ranch)
Los Angeles (Venice Beach) 

This leg's Detour was a choice between Pic à Glace (Ice Pick) or Picasso. In Pic à Glace, teams had to take control of an ice cream cart and sell ice cream cones for at least  a cone until they made  to receive their next clue. In Picasso, teams had to convince passersby to let them paint caricatures of them and sell them to make  to receive their next clue.

In this leg's Roadblock, one team member had to successfully perform a burnout in a car on a movie set to receive their next clue.

Additional tasks
After the Detour, teams would receive a CD containing nine French versions of Disney songs ("Bibbidi-Bobbidi-Boo", "Everybody Wants to Be a Cat", "Colors of the Wind", "Bella Notte", "The Bare Necessities", "Hakuna Matata", "Following the Leader", "Supercalifragilisticexpialidocious", "I Wan'na Be Like You") and had to memorise the names of these songs while listening to the CD on the way to their hotel.
Outside the Walt Disney Concert Hall, teams had to locate a saxophonist, who would be playing one of the nine songs from the CD ("The Bare Necessities"), and correctly identify the song to receive their next clue.
On Hollywood Boulevard, teams had to locate four stars on the Hollywood Walk of Fame using a photograph of four peoples' heads edited onto Mount Rushmore: Sylvester Stallone, Michael Jackson, Steven Spielberg, and Meryl Streep. Once they had located all four and taken a picture of each, they would give them to a woman dressed as Marilyn Monroe in exchange for their next clue.

Leg 6 (United States → Brazil)

Airdate: 26 November 2012
 Los Angeles (Los Angeles International Airport) to Foz do Iguaçu, Brazil (Foz do Iguaçu International Airport)
Iguaçu National Park (Jungle Camp) (Overnight Rest)
Iguaçu National Park (Mirante Garganta do Diabo) 
Iguaçu National Park (Bike Parking Lot)
 Iguaçu National Park (Iguaçu River)
 Iguaçu National Park (Cânion Iguaçu ) 
 Iguaçu National Park (Puerto Macuco) 

This leg's Detour was a choice between Connaissance (Knowledge) or Patience. In Connaissance, teams had to choose from a variety of items representing Brazil, Argentina and Paraguay, and correctly give five of each to the correct representatives of each country to receive their next clue. However, a bank note from Panama and a map from Chile were included to trick teams. In Patience, teams had to untangle a large knot of ropes to release their next clue from within.

In this leg's Roadblock, one team member had to rappel  down Cânion Iguaçu to receive their next clue.

Additional tasks
At the Jungle Camp, teams signed up for departure times the following morning. At night, teams received video messages from their loved ones at home.
After the Detour, teams had to repair and inflate the tires of bikes, which they would use to ride to their next destination.
At the Iguaçu River, teams had to ride kayaks  down the river to get their next clue.
After the Roadblock, teams had to raft  down the river to the Pit Stop.

Additional note
Throughout this leg, teams followed coloured flags to guide them around the national park. Orange flags led to the camp, red led to the Detour clue, pink led to the knowledge Detour, green led to the patience Detour and the bike parking lot, light blue led to the end of the bike course, and yellow led to the Roadblock clue.

Leg 7 (Brazil)

Airdate: 3 December 2012
 Foz do Iguaçu (Foz do Iguaçu International Airport) to Rio de Janeiro (Rio de Janeiro/Galeão International Airport)
Rio de Janeiro (Cantagalo Slums) 
Rio de Janeiro (Christ the Redeemer )
 Rio de Janeiro (Copacabana Beach outside Rio Othon Palace)
Rio de Janeiro (Largo da Carioca )
Rio de Janeiro (Botafogo Beach) 

In this leg's Roadblock, one team member had to kick a soccer ball through a small metal grate representing their goal, but could not let the ball knock away the piece of wood at the bottom of the opening, meaning teams needed to kick the ball through the air. They would have to accomplish this task twice in five attempts, or they would have to go to the back of the line.

This leg's Detour was a choice between Jeu de Jambes (Leg Game) or Jeu de Plage (Beach Game). In Jeu de Jambes, teams had to learn and perform a samba dance to the satisfaction of a judge to receive their next clue. In Jeu de Plage, teams had to add the word "Race" to a pre-existing sand sculpture of Corcovado with "Amazing" written on it. They would then have to cover a small Christ the Redeemer statue with wet sand to complete the sculpture and receive their next clue.

Additional tasks
In the Cantagalo slums, teams had to follow Amazing Race flags and arrows to find a young boy named João with their next clue.
At Largo da Carioca, teams had to conduct a survey with the people of Rio de Janeiro. They had to find eight people from eight different states of Brazil and bring them to the judge, who would verify their place of birth and stamp the survey.

Leg 8 (Brazil → South Africa)

Airdate: 10 December 2012
 Rio de Janeiro (Rio de Janeiro/Galeão International Airport) to Cape Town, South Africa (Cape Town International Airport)
Cape Town (Victoria & Alfred Waterfront) 
Cape Town (Protea Hotel Fire & Ice!) (Overnight Rest)
Cape Town (District Six Museum)
Cape Town (Castle of Good Hope)
Cape Town (Khayelitsha – Intyatyambo Orphanage)
Cape Town (Cape of Good Hope – Cape Point)
Cape Town (Rhodes Memorial) 

This leg's Detour was a choice between Radio or Disco. In Radio, teams had to travel to the Waterfront's market, where they had to put together two radios with the material provided to receive their clue. In Disco, teams had to learn and perform a Gumboot dance with a troupe of African dancers to receive their clue.

Additional tasks
At the District Six Museum, teams had to complete a wood block puzzle, which would reveal two street names. Teams had to use the large map of District 6 on the ground to find the written name of someone who used to live at the intersection of these two before being removed during Apartheid. They would then have to find this person inside the museum to receive their next clue.
After the task in the District Six Museum, teams had to procure a copy of the Cape Times and had to find their next clue printed inside, indicating where they would find their cars and their next clue envelope.
At the Intyatyambo Orphanage, teams participated in Mandela Day activities and helped out at the orphanage by delivering gifts provided in their vehicles, doing chores and repairing the site for 67 minutes (in reference to the Mandela Day slogan) before receiving their next clue.

Leg 9 (South Africa)

Airdate: 17 December 2012
Cape Town (Protea Hotel Fire & Ice!) (Pit Start)
Touws River (Aquila Private Game Reserve)
Touws River (Aquila Private Game Reserve – Stone Cottage)
Touws River (Aquila Private Game Reserve – Boma Area)  
Paarl (Nelson Wine Estate) 
Franschhoek, Stellenbosch (Huguenot Monument) 

This leg's Detour was a choice between Jeu de la Terre (Dry Game) or Jeu de l'eau (Wet Game). In Jeu de la Terre, teams were faced with a series of pots suspended from an arch. The pot in the middle was painted black, and had to be avoided. Teams had to use a traditional tribal club from a distance to hit the pots. If the black pot was hit, teams incurred a ten-minute penalty. In Jeu de l'eau, teams had to open an ostrich egg and empty its contents. They then had to use the egg shells to transport water and fill a jar to receive their next clue.

In this leg's Roadblock, one team member had to roll a  leaking wine barrel  to the wine vats and refill it before receiving their next clue.

Additional tasks
At the Aquila Game Reserve, teams first participated in a safari and had to use binoculars to look for numbers scattered throughout the safari, which would be used to answer the eight questions about wildlife after arriving at Stone Cottage. These questions were: The maximum speed of lion (50 km/h), days hippo can go without drinking (5 days), Elephant gestation period (22 months), amount of vertebrae in a giraffe's spines (7), average weight of cheetah (60 kg), amount of time the lion can sleep per day (20 hours), amount of time a hippo can stay underwater (6 minutes) and white rhino's life expectancy (45). Once they answered all questions correctly, teams could proceed to the Detour.

Leg 10 (South Africa → France)

Airdate: 24 December 2012
Cape Town (Protea Hotel Fire & Ice!) (Pit Start)
 Cape Town (Port of Cape Town)
 Cape Town (Cape Town International Airport) to Paris, Île-de-France, France (Charles de Gaulle Airport)
Ermenonville, Picardy (La Mer de Sable)
Chantilly (Château de Chantilly) 
Fontaine-Chaalis (Chaalis Abbey)
Saint-Denis, Île-de-France (Stade de France) 

In this season's final Roadblock, teams took a boat out to the ocean, where one team member had to descend down in a shark cage. They then had to take a photograph of a shark, fitting its entire body into the image, before they could grab their clue from the shark cage and return to the boat. If they took a good photograph of the shark, they would receive a 15-minute headstart at the Paris airport.

This season's final Detour was a choice between Crème Fouettée (Whipped Cream) or Cible Visée (Target Sight). In Crème Fouettée, teams had to use the provided ingredients to make a batch of Crème Chantilly to a chef's satisfaction to receive their next clue. In Cible Visée, teams had to shoot arrows at a target using a bow and needed to get two in the outer blue part, two in the middle red part, and two in the centre yellow part to receive their next clue.

Additional tasks
At La Mer de Sable, teams had to dig in the sand to find their next clue. However, some holes contained clues saying "Try again".
In the final challenge at the Chaalis Abbey, teams had to place markers containing distances in kilometres next to each destination they visited on the season, indicating how far away the location is from Paris, to receive their final clue. The correct answers were:
{| class="wikitable"
|-
!City
!Distance
|-
|Dubai
|5245
|-
|Bangkok
|9443
|-
|Tokyo
|9712
|-
|Honolulu
|11969
|-
|Los Angeles
|9085
|-
|Iguaçu
|9982
|-
|Rio de Janeiro
|9168
|-
|Cape Town
|9341
|-
|Aquila
|9192
|-
|}
At the Stade de France, teams had to find the commemorative star for Zinedine Zidane, where they would find a clue box containing tickets that would grant them entrance to the stadium and to the final Pit Stop.

Additional notes
Teams opened their clue for this leg's Roadblock after arriving at the previous leg's Pit Stop. They had to decide who would perform it before checking in there.
Like the first leg, teams were not told of their placing after arriving at the Pit Stop. Instead, they were all told together after all teams had checked in.

Ratings
The following information was taken from Médiamétrie.

References

External links

French reality television series
France
2010s French television series
2012 French television series debuts
2012 French television series endings
French television series based on American television series
Television shows filmed in France
Television shows filmed in the United Arab Emirates
Television shows filmed in Thailand
Television shows filmed in Japan
Television shows filmed in Hawaii
Television shows filmed in California
Television shows filmed in Brazil
Television shows filmed in South Africa